Chaetogastra herbacea, synonym Tibouchina herbacea, is a species of flowering plant in the family Melastomataceae, native to southern Brazil and north-eastern Argentina. It has been introduced to Hawaii. It was first described, as Arthrostemma herbaceum, by Augustin de Candolle in 1828.

References

herbaceae
Flora of Argentina
Flora of Brazil
Plants described in 1828